Dedication 3 is a mixtape by Lil Wayne, hosted by DJ Drama. It is the sequel to its predecessors, The Dedication and the highly successful Dedication 2, becoming the third in Lil Wayne's "Gangsta Grillz" series. Lil Wayne also told MTV, "Tha Carter IV is nice but you need to be looking for Dedication 3". Although Dedication 3 was a major success, it failed to match that of its predecessors despite gaining some attention. The mixtape has sold over 70,000 copies in the United States, despite being available for free download. Besides the interludes, a majority of the mixtape has Wayne using auto-tune and rapping alongside artists signed to his label, Young Money Entertainment.

Track listing 
 All tracks were arranged by DJ Drama.

Charts

Weekly charts

Year-end charts

References

External links 
 "Critics’ choice: New CDs". The New York Times. November 16, 2008

2008 mixtape albums
Lil Wayne albums
DJ Drama albums
Sequel albums
Young Money Entertainment albums